The 1996 Critérium du Dauphiné Libéré was the 48th edition of the cycle race and was held from 2 June to 9 June 1996. The race started in Megève and finished in Grenoble. The race was won by Miguel Induráin of the Banesto team.

Teams
Sixteen teams, containing a total of 127 riders, participated in the race:

 
 
 
 
 
 
 
 
 
 
 
 
 Collstrop–Eddy Merckx

Route

Stages

Prologue
2 June 1996 – Megève,  (ITT)

Stage 1
3 June 1996 – Megève to Villefontaine,

Stage 2
4 June 1996 – Charbonnières-les-Bains to Firminy,

Stage 3
5 June 1996 – Saint-Maurice-de-Lignon to Tournon-sur-Rhône,

Stage 4
6 June 1996 – Tain-l'Hermitage to Mont Ventoux,

Stage 5
7 June 1996 – Gigondas to Beaumes-de-Venise,  (ITT)

Stage 6
8 May 1996 – Digne-les-Bains to Briançon,

Stage 7
9 June 1996 – Briançon to Grenoble,

General classification

References

1996
1996 in French sport
June 1996 sports events in Europe